The nurikabe (塗り壁 or 塗壁) is a yōkai, or spirit, from Japanese folklore. Its name translates to "plaster wall", and it is said to manifest as an invisible wall that impedes or misdirects travelers walking at night. Sometimes referred to in English as "The Wall" or "Mr. Wall", this yōkai is described as quite tall, to prevent people from climbing over it, and wide enough to dampen any attempts to go around it. Japanese scholar and folklorist Kunio Yanagita recorded perhaps the most prominent early example of nurikabe and other yōkai in his books. Manga artist Mizuki Shigeru claims to have encountered a nurikabe in New Guinea, inspiring a nurikabe character in his manga Gegege no Kitarō.

Mythology

The nurikabe takes the form of a wall—usually invisible—that blocks the path of travelers as they're walking. With the exception of Mizuki Shigeru's experience in New Guinea, most legends and accounts of nurikabe come from Kyūshū, in the Ōita and Fukuoka prefectures. Some iterations of the legend say that trying to go around the wall is futile as it extends forever. Others say that knocking on the bottom left part of the wall with a stick will make it disappear, but that knocking on the upper part of it will yield no result. It has been suggested that the legend of the nurikabe was created to explain travelers losing their bearings on long journeys. Some nurikabe-like experiences that have been recorded have been attributed as the doing of tanuki, known as tanuki no nurikabe. These happenings, instead of involving a wall, are instances where the traveler suddenly cannot see in front of themselves.

In popular culture

The nurikabe has been explicitly referenced in several forms of pop culture. There is a nurikabe character named Nurikabe in Mizuki Shigeru's manga series Gegege no Kitarō. The character's main function is to be a shield in order to protect other members of the Kitarō family. Mizuki attributes much of his inspiration for the series to an experience he had with a nurikabe in New Guinea during World War II, as well as to the writings of Kunio Yanagita. Mizuki's illustration for the nurikabe gave it a more physical and anthropomorphic form with arms and legs, rather than the more traditional invisible wall concept.

References
妖怪ドットコム 『図説 妖怪辞典』 幻冬舎コミックス、2008年。。

Yōkai